Fikri Elma (1 January 1934 – 15 November 1999) was a Turkish footballer. He played as a forward, most notably for Ankara Demirspor, with whom he finished top scorer of the 1961–62 Milli Lig. Elma was one of the top scorers in Turkish league history with 128 goals to his name. He died in Ankara on 15 November 1999 and was interred in Karşıyaka cemetery.

References

Turkish footballers
Ankara Demirspor footballers
1999 deaths
1934 births
Turkey youth international footballers
Burials at Karşıyaka Cemetery, Ankara
Footballers from Ankara
Association football forwards